Manimaran is an Indian film director, working in the Tamil film industry.

Career

He made his directorial debut in Tamil, Udhayam NH4 (2013) featuring Siddharth and a newcomer Ashrita Shetty in lead roles. It was simultaneously dubbed and released in Telugu in the same year. Udhayam NH4 was produced by Meeka Entertainment & Grassroot Film Company for which director Vetrimaaran penned the story. Manimaran was born and brought up in a town Walajapet near Vellore. Manimaran was one of a former associate of director Vetrimaaran and had worked in Vetrimaaran's films Polladhavan and Aadukalam. He collaborated once again with director Vetrimaran and actor Dhanush as a second unit direct in the 2019 film, Asuran. In 2021, he directed Sangathalaivan. The Samuthirakani-starrer wears its Communist shirt proudly but fails to sell its politics convincingly. Manimaran is far too abrasive in that he projects his protagonist as simply no more than the average Tamil film hero.

Filmography

References

External links 

Tamil film directors
Living people
Film directors from Tamil Nadu
1974 births
Tamil screenwriters
Screenwriters from Tamil Nadu